The 2019 Homecoming was a professional wrestling pay-per-view event produced by Impact Wrestling. It took place on January 6, 2019, at The Asylum in Nashville, Tennessee. It was the first event in the Homecoming chronology.

Production

Background
Initially Impact Wrestling, then known as Total Nonstop Action Wrestling (TNA), produced weekly pay-per-view shows which operated as the company's main source of revenue, in place of monthly pay-per-view events used by other promotions. These shows took place mostly at the Tennessee State Fairground Sports Arena in Nashville, Tennessee, nicknamed the "TNA Asylum". The name "Homecoming" comes from their return to the Fairground for the first time since 2010.

Storylines 
The event featured professional wrestling matches that involve different wrestlers from pre-existing scripted feuds and storylines. Wrestlers portrayed villains, heroes, or less distinguishable characters in the scripted events that built tension and culminated in a wrestling match or series of matches.

On the November 15, 2018 episode of Impact!, Brian Cage defeated Sami Callihan to retain the Impact X Division Championship. After the match, he announced that he would use his Option C privilege, voluntarily vacating the X Division Championship, to challenge Johnny Impact at Homecoming for the Impact World Championship.

Results

References

External links

Live Stream on FITE.TV 

2019 Impact Wrestling pay-per-view events
2019 in Tennessee
Events in Nashville, Tennessee
Professional wrestling in Nashville, Tennessee
January 2019 events in the United States